Rudolf Günthardt (born 15 October 1936) is a Swiss equestrian. He was born in Adliswil in the Canton of Zurich. He won a silver medal in team eventing at the 1960 Summer Olympics in Rome, together with Anton Bühler and Hans Schwarzenbach. He placed 20th in individual eventing at the 1960 Olympics.

References

1936 births
Living people
Olympic silver medalists for Switzerland
Equestrians at the 1960 Summer Olympics
Swiss male equestrians
Olympic medalists in equestrian
Medalists at the 1960 Summer Olympics
20th-century Swiss people